Fredrik Engelstad (born 12 March 1944) is a Norwegian sociologist. He has written several books.

He is the son of writer Carl Fredrik Engelstad and physician Vibeke Engelstad, and a nephew of archivist Sigurd Engelstad. He is married to professor Irene Johnson.

Engelstad earned the mag.art. degree in 1974 and the dr.philos. degree in 1989. He was director of the Norwegian Institute for Social Research from 1986 to 2007. From 1990 to 2007 he held a part-time position as Professor of Sociology at the University of Oslo. He became a full-time Professor of Sociology at the University of Oslo in 2008 and became Professor Emeritus in 2014.

He has been a visiting fellow at Yale University (1981), the University of California, Berkeley (1993), the University of Chicago (1996) and the Northwestern University (2006).

Honours
Member of the Royal Norwegian Society of Sciences and Letters, 2009
Honorary Prize of the Norwegian Sociological Association, 2004

Selected works 
 Fredrik Engelstad, ed. (1999) Om makt. Teori og kritikk. Oslo: AdNotam Gyldendal
 Fredrik Engelstad, Carl Erik Grenness, Ragnvald Kalleberg and Raino Malnes (1998), Samfunn og vitenskap. Oslo: AdNotam Gyldendal
 Fredrik Engelstad (1992), Kjærlighetens irrganger. Sinn og samfunn i Bjørnsons og Ibsens diktning. Oslo: Gyldendal
 Fredrik Engelstad (1990), Likhet og styring. Deltakerdemokratiet på prøve. Oslo: Universitetsforlaget
 Dag Østerberg and Fredrik Engelstad (1992), Samfunnsformasjonen. 3. edition. Oslo: Pax

References 

Norwegian sociologists
Academic staff of the University of Oslo
1944 births
Living people
Royal Norwegian Society of Sciences and Letters